Mark Daniel Kolozsvary (born September 4, 1995) is an American professional baseball catcher in the Baltimore Orioles organization. He previously played in Major League Baseball (MLB) for the Cincinnati Reds. He was drafted by the Reds in the seventh round of the 2017 MLB draft.

Career

Amateur career
Kolozsvary attended Mount Dora Christian Academy in Mount Dora, Florida, and transferred to Tavares High School in Tavares, Florida, for his senior year. He enrolled at the University of Florida, where he played college baseball for the Florida Gators. With the Gators, he was a member of the 2017 College World Series (CWS). Kolozsvary had one plate appearance during the CWS, hitting a single off of Nick Lodolo.

Cincinnati Reds
The Cincinnati Reds selected Kolozsvary in the seventh round, 197th overall, of the 2017 MLB draft, and he signed with the team. He made his professional debut with the rookie-level Billings Mustangs, posting a .305/.362/.411 slash in 28 games. In 2018, Kolozsvary played for the Single-A Dayton Dragons, where he hit .225/.310/.324 with 3 home runs and 27 RBI. The following season, Kolozsvary received a promotion to the High-A Daytona Tortugas, and slashed .188/.341/.321 in 79 games with the team.

During the COVID-19 pandemic, which resulted in the cancellation of the 2020 minor league season, the Reds included Kolozsvary in their 60-man player pool at their alternate site, but did not see any game time in the major leagues. Kolozsvary was assigned to the Double-A Chattanooga Lookouts to begin the 2021 season. In August, the Reds promoted him to the Triple-A Louisville Bats. On September 20, 2021, Cincinnati selected Kolozsvary‘s contact and added him to the active roster, but he was optioned back on September 22 without making an appearance with the Reds.

Kolozsvary began the 2022 season with Chattanooga. He was selected to the 40-man roster and made his major league debut on April 20, appearing as a defensive substitute for the Reds. On April 28, Kolozsvary collected his first MLB hit and RBI, lacing a double off of San Diego Padres starter and former Team USA teammate Nick Martinez.

Baltimore Orioles
On October 14, 2022, Kolozsvary was claimed off waivers by the Baltimore Orioles. On November 19, he was removed from the 40-man roster and sent outright to the Triple-A Norfolk Tides.

International career
Kolozsvary played for the United States national baseball team for qualifying for baseball at the 2020 Summer Olympics. After the team qualified, he was named to the Olympics roster on July 2. The team went on to win silver, falling to Japan in the gold-medal game.

References

External links

Living people
1995 births
People from Eustis, Florida
Baseball players from Florida
Major League Baseball catchers
Cincinnati Reds players
Florida Gators baseball players
Billings Mustangs players
Dayton Dragons players
Scottsdale Scorpions players
Daytona Tortugas players
Chattanooga Lookouts players
Louisville Bats players
United States national baseball team players
Olympic baseball players of the United States
Baseball players at the 2020 Summer Olympics
Medalists at the 2020 Summer Olympics
Olympic silver medalists for the United States in baseball
Lakeshore Chinooks players